Santa Maria di Sala is a town in the Metropolitan City of Venice, Veneto, northern Italy. It is crossed by the SP32 provincial road.

Twin towns
Santa Maria di Sala is twinned with:

  Hvar, Croatia, since 2009

Sources

(Google Maps)

Cities and towns in Veneto